Isilkulsky District is an administrative and municipal district (raion), one of the thirty-two in Omsk Oblast, Russia. It is located in the southwest of the oblast. Its administrative center is the town of Isilkul (which is not administratively a part of the district). Population: 18,942 (2010 Census);

Administrative and municipal status
Within the framework of administrative divisions, Isilkulsky District is one of the thirty-two in the oblast. The town of Isilkul serves as its administrative center, despite being incorporated separately as a town of oblast significance—an administrative unit with the status equal to that of the districts.

As a municipal division, the district is incorporated as Isilkulsky Municipal District, with the town of oblast significance of Isilkul being incorporated within it as Isilkul Urban Settlement.

Notable residents 

Georgi Vyun (1944–2008), football player and coach, born in Solntsevka

References

Notes

Sources



Districts of Omsk Oblast